Saint-Génis-des-Fontaines is a commune in the Pyrénées-Orientales department in southern France.

Geography 
Saint-Génis-des-Fontaines is located in the canton of Vallespir-Albères and in the arrondissement of Céret.

Population

Sites of interest 
Saint-Génis-des-Fontaines is home to a Benedictine abbey, founded in the late 8th or early 9th century.

See also
Communes of the Pyrénées-Orientales department

References

Communes of Pyrénées-Orientales